Liberal Party of Guatemala (Previously: Coalition by the Change) was a political party in Guatemala.

History
Previously the political party was denominated Coalition by the Change. But at the time of its registration it was called the Liberal Party of Guatemala, it was registered in 2015 and registered by the Supreme Electoral Tribunal in 2017. Its leader is Andrés Ayau.

Presidential elections

References

External links

2017 establishments in Guatemala
2020 disestablishments in Guatemala
Defunct political parties in Guatemala
Political parties disestablished in 2020
Political parties established in 2017
Populist parties